Kendriya Vidyalaya No. 4, Gwalior is affiliated to CBSE, New Delhi and forms a part of Kendriya Vidyalaya Sangathan (under Ministry of HRD, Union Govt. of India). The Vidyalaya imparts school education up to class XII in the streams Science, Commerce and Arts.

History
Kendriya Vidyalaya No. 4, AFS Maharajpur, Gwalior was established as one of the offshoots of KVS, Bhopal Region in 1985 with 141 students and a few staff members in a temporary building. Presently it comprises 1249 students  and 35 teachers.

Academics
Vidyalaya imparts primary education, education for secondary classes and senior secondary classes education in Science, Commerce and arts streams.

Present status
Presently, the school forms part of KVS, Bhopal Region and Mr. Umesh Chandra is principal of the institution.

See also 
 List of Kendriya Vidyalayas

References

External links 
 Kendriya Vidyalaya Sangathan

Kendriya Vidyalayas
Primary schools in India
High schools and secondary schools in Madhya Pradesh
Schools in Gwalior
Educational institutions established in 1985
1985 establishments in Madhya Pradesh